Tverskoy (masculine), Tverskaya (feminine), or Tverskoye (neuter) is the name of several rural localities in Russia:
Tverskoy (rural locality), a khutor in Novopashkovsky Rural Okrug of Krylovsky District in Krasnodar Krai; 
Tverskoye, Dmitrovskoye Rural Settlement, Selizharovsky District, Tver Oblast, a village in Dmitrovskoye Rural Settlement of Selizharovsky District in Tver Oblast
Tverskoye, Selishchenskoye Rural Settlement, Selizharovsky District, Tver Oblast, a village in Selishchenskoye Rural Settlement of Selizharovsky District in Tver Oblast
Tverskaya (rural locality), a stanitsa in Tverskoy Rural Okrug of Apsheronsky District in Krasnodar Krai;